Luis Rodrigo Daher Benítez (born 25 February 1992) was an Argentine footballer. He played for clubs like Paraguay's Sol de América or Chilean side Lota Schwager.

References
 
 

1992 births
Living people
Argentine footballers
Argentine expatriate footballers
Godoy Cruz Antonio Tomba footballers
Lota Schwager footballers
Club Sol de América footballers
Primera B de Chile players
Expatriate footballers in Chile
Association football midfielders
People from Maipú, Argentina
Sportspeople from Mendoza Province